Tori Carrington is the pen name by the husband–wife writing team of the late Tony Karayianni and Lori Schlachter Karayianni. They have written over 28 romance novels since 1998.

Biography
Tony Karayianni was born in Smila, Greece and he grew up in Athens. He immigrated to the United States in late 1976. He passed suddenly April 16, 2016. Lori Schlachter was born in Toledo, Ohio, United States. She studied at Catholic Central and graduated with a degree in computer science from Macomber-Whitney. For years, she worked in the computer industry.

They began writing in June 1984. Their first novel was published in 1998 as Tori Carrington ("Tori" is formed from "Tony" and "Lori"). Karayianni and Schlachter married in 1987. They had two sons, Tony, Jr. and Tim.

Bibliography

Single novels
Constant Craving (1998)
Just Eight Months Old... (2000)
You Sexy Thing! (2001)
Skin Deep (2002)
Private Investigations (2002)
Dangerous... (2007)

Magnificent McCoy Men series
License to Thrill (1999)
The P.I. Who Loved Her (2000)
For Her Eyes Only (2000)
You Only Love Once (2001)
Never Say Never Again (2001)
From McCoy, With Love (2005)
A Real McCoy (2005)
Seducing McCoy: You Only Love Once / Never Say Never Again (omnibus) (2006)

Old Orchard series
The Woman for Dusty Conrad (2001)
What a Woman Wants (2002)
Where You Least Expect It (2004)

Legal Briefs series
A Stranger's Touch (2002)
Fire and Ice (2002)
Going Too Far (2003)

Kiss and Tell series
Night Fever (2003)
Flavor of the Month (2003)
Just Between Us... (2003)

Sleeping with Secrets series
Forbidden (2004)
Indecent (2004)
Wicked (2004)

Dangerous Liaisons series
Possession (2005)
Obsession (2006)
Submission (2006)

Sofie Metropolis series
Sofie Metropolis (2005)
Dirty Laundry (2006)
Foul Play (2007)
Working Stiff (2008)
Love Bites    {2011}
Queens Ransom  {2012}

Trueblood Texas series
Every Move You Make (2002)

Bad Girls Club series
Red-hot and Reckless (2003)
Taken (2007)

Code Red series
Total Exposure (2004)

Omnibus in collaboration
More Than Words: Volume 3 (2003) (with Karen Harper, Catherine Mann, Kasey Michaels and Susan Wiggs) (Homecoming Season / Find the Way / Here Comes the Heroes / Touched by Love / Stitch in Time)
Private Scandals (2004) (with Judy Christenberry and Joanna Wayne) (Shadows of the Past / Family Unveiled / Sleeping with Secrets)
Where You Least Expect It / Isn't it Rich? (2004) (with Sherryl Woods)
Marry Me... Maybe?: License to Thrill / I Thee Wed (2004) (with Anne McAllister)
That's Amore! (2005) (with Janelle Denison and Leslie Kelly) (Meet the Parents / I Do, Don't I? / There Goes the Groom)
Wedding Fever (2006) (with Janelle Denison and Leslie Kelly)

External links
Tori Carrington's Official Website
Tori Carrington at eHarlequin
Tori Carrington at Mills & Boon
Tori Carrington at Fantastic Fiction

20th-century American novelists
21st-century American novelists
American romantic fiction writers
American women novelists
Collective pseudonyms
20th-century American women writers
21st-century American women writers